Reed and Stem (present-day WASA Studio) is an American architectural and engineering firm. The firm was founded in St. Paul, Minnesota in 1891 as a partnership between Charles A. Reed (1858–1911) and Allen H. Stem (1856–1931), the successful partnership captured a wide range of commissions. The firm was reformed as Wank Adams Slavin Associates in 1961, and adopted the name WASA Studio in 2004.

History
One early work was Medical Hall on the campus of the University of Minnesota.  They were, however, most widely known for their work on railway stations over the course of two decades.  Through Reed's relationship, by marriage, to the president of the New York Central Railroad, they gained a high-profile commission for the construction of New York's Grand Central Terminal with the architecture firm of Warren and Wetmore, and the newly hired Alfred T. Fellheimer as lead architect.  In addition, Reed and Stem undertook many significant projects for the Great Northern Railway and the Northern Pacific Railway.  After Reed's death, Stem continued to practice with Fellheimer until his retirement in 1920.

The firm moved from Minnesota to New York after being selected to design Grand Central Terminal.

The Reed and Stem papers held by the Northwest Architectural Archives, in the Elmer L. Andersen Library, at the University of Minnesota constitute only a small portion of their output. Eight unique commissions are listed, and represent a sample of the firm's experience in non-railroad related commission work, namely residences and commercial buildings.

The firm was reformed as Wank Adams Slavin Associates in 1961, and adopted the name WASA Studio in 2004. The firm's office is located on Broadway. In 2015, the firm—which had millions of dollars in debt and was facing several lawsuits from previous former clients—filed for bankruptcy and was granted chapter 11 protection from creditors.

Major commissions
The firm "has worked on more than 100 train stations ... along with college campus buildings and corporate parks."

Grand Central Terminal, New York, New York, 1913, NRHP-listed
King Street Station, Seattle, Washington, 1906 
Livingston Depot, Livingston, Montana, 1902
Crane Ordway Building, St. Paul, Minnesota, 1904
The Saint Paul Hotel,  St. Paul, Minnesota, 1910
Michigan Central Station, Detroit, Michigan, 1913
Tacoma Union Station, Tacoma, Washington, 1911 
Wulling Hall (Medical Hall), University of Minnesota, Minneapolis, Minnesota, 1892 
Northern Pacific Depot, Ellensburg, Washington, 1910
Grand Central Palace, New York City, 1913 with Warren and Wetmore, demolished 1964
Saint Paul Athletic Club, St. Paul
Cincinnati Union Terminal
Jerome Robbins Theater

Work with the Northern Pacific Railway
During the tenure of President Howard Elliott (1903–1912), the Northern Pacific Railway Company engaged in the upgrading of numerous depots across its system, from Minnesota to Washington. Many of these depots bear common architectural stamps, and are likely to be Reed and Stem designs. There is also the possibility the designs for smaller stations were drawn up by the Northern Pacific's Engineering Department, based on the design elements of Reed and Stem. In addition to the major works, such as the Tacoma Union Station and the former Montana Division Headquarters at Livingston, Montana, these lesser structures like Ellensburg, Washington, probably include:

 Aitkin, Minnesota, 1916
 Beach, North Dakota
 Belgrade, Montana
 Billings, Montana, 1909
 Butte, Montana, 1906
 Centralia, Washington, 1912
 Chehalis, Washington, 1912
 Detroit Lakes, Minnesota, 1908
 Fergus Falls, Minnesota
 Garrison, Montana, demolished 2000
 Helena, Montana, 1904
 Missoula, Montana, 1901, Renaissance Revival style
 Ritzville, Washington, 1910
 Sandpoint, Idaho, 1916
 Staples, Minnesota, 1909
 Toppenish, Washington, 1911 The Northern Pacific's Toppenish depot is now the Northern Pacific Railway Museum
 Trident, Montana, 1909, moved to Three Forks, Montana, July 27, 2011, for rehabilitation into a museum)
 Wallace, Idaho, 1902
 Yakima, Washington, : The Northern Pacific built at least three depots in Yakima. The first when they began construction across Stampede Pass c. 1884, the second, larger wood structure in 1901 was alleged to have a clock tower, and the final depot in a style similar to that in nearby Ellensburg, Washington, c. 1912. The last was likely the Reed and Stem design.  Another noted architect -- Cass Gilbert, designed the 1901 depot. This structure was later relocated to another part of town, and converted into an apartment building. As of 2010, it was still standing in Yakima, minus the clock tower. Because the Northern Pacific never installed clocks in a tower, instead they used their large Monad trademark (the ying-yang), adopted by the road in 1896. In addition to the 1901 depot at Yakima, Gilbert also designed the Northern Pacific's depots at Little Falls, Minnesota, Bismarck, North Dakota, and Fargo, North Dakota.

Several of their works are listed on the National Register of Historic Places.  These are (with attribution):
One or more works in Commercial District, Roughly bounded by Park, C, Clark, 3rd, and Callendar Sts. Livingston, Montana (Reed & Stem), NRHP-listed
Fort Yellowstone, Mammoth Hot Springs, Wyoming; Norris, Wyoming; Gardiner, Montana, near Buffalo Lake, Idaho Mammoth Hot Springs, WY (Reed and Stem, Reamer, Robert), NRHP-listed
Grand Central Terminal, 71–105 E. 42nd St. New York, New York (Reed & Stem), NRHP-listed 
Grand Central Terminal (Boundary Increase: Park Avenue Viaduct), 71-105 E. 42nd St., Park Ave. between E. 40th and E. 42nd Sts. New York, New York (Reed & Stern), NRHP-listed
One or more works in Helena Railroad Depot Historic District, Roughly bounded by Railroad/Helena Aves., Gallatin St., N. Sanders St. and N. Harris St. Helena, Montana (Reed, Charles A.), NRHP-listed
King Street Station, 3rd St., S. and S. King St. Seattle, Washington (Reed & Stem), NRHP-listed
Morris Park Station, under Espalanade at Bogart and Colden Ave. and Hone Ave. Bronx, New York (Reed & Stem), NRHP-listed
Northern Pacific Railroad Depot, Railroad and Higgins Ave. Missoula, Montana (Stem & Reed), NRHP-listed
Northern Pacific Railway Depot, 410 E. Main Ave. Bismarck, North Dakota (Reed & Stem), NRHP-listed
Northern Pacific Railway Passenger Depot, 606 W. Third St. Ellensburg, Washington (Reed & Stem), NRHP-listed
Forest Lodge Library, 13450 Cty Hwy M Cable, Wisconsin (Stem, Allen H.), NRHP-listed
New York, Westchester and Boston Railroad Administration Building, 481 Morris Park Ave. New York, New York (Stem, Allen H.), NRHP-listed

References

Sources
 Cone, Rufus L., and Dick, James C. Electronic mail, June 14, 2011. Dr. Cone is author of several articles on the history of the Northern Pacific Railway for the Northern Pacific Railway Historical Association's quarterly  The Mainstreeter. James C. Dick is volunteer archivist for the Northern Pacific Railway Historical Association Archives in St. Paul, Minn.
 Malby, Andy. Moving Day. Belgrade, Montana News.  Accessed August 15, 2011. (Covers moving of Trident, Mont., depot to Three Forks, Mont., for use as a museum.)
 Nixon, Jeanne. Missoula Tour: The NP Depot. Accessed June 15, 2011.
  Cass Gilbert Society Northern Pacific Railway Depot - Yakima.  Accessed June 14, 2011.
 Helena As She Was - Transportation via Rail.  Accessed June 15, 2011.
 NP Railroad Depot Museum. Accessed June 14, 2011.

Architecture firms based in Minnesota
American railway architects